Max Dilger (born 14 July 1989) is a German speedway rider who rode for Kolejarz Opole in the 2010 Polish Speedway Second League.

Dilger was nominated as a track reserve at 2008 Speedway Grand Prix of Germany, but was replaced by Kevin Wölbert.

Career details

Speedway

World Championships 

 Individual U-21 World Championship
 2007 - 14th placed in the Quarter-Final One
 2008 - 15th placed in the Semi-Final One
 2009 - 13th placed in the Semi-Final Two
 2010 - qualify to the Semi-Final Two
 Team U-21 World Championship
 2006 -  Rybnik - 4th placed (2 pts)
 2007 -  Abensberg - 4th placed (4 pts)
 2008 - 3rd place in the Qualifying Round Two
 2009 - 2nd place in the Qualifying Round One
 2010 - 3rd place in the Qualifying Round Two

European Championships 

 Individual European Championship
 2009 - 8th placed in the Semi-Final One
 European Pairs Championship
 2006 -  Lendava - 7th placed (0 pts)
 2007 - 6th placed in the Semi-Final One
 2009 -  Miskolc - 5th placed (did not started)
 Individual U-19 European Championship
 2008 - 13th placed in the Semi-Final Three
 Team U-19 European Championship
 2008 -  Rawicz - Runner-up (2 pts)
 European Club Champions' Cup
 2007 - 4th placed in the Semi-Final One for MC Pfaffenhofen

Longtrack

World Longtrack Championship

Grand-Prix Series

Grasstrack

European Championship

See also 
 Germany national speedway team (U21, U19)

References 

1989 births
Living people
German speedway riders
Place of birth missing (living people)
Individual Speedway Long Track World Championship riders